The Women's Javelin Throw event at the 1968 Summer Olympics took place on October 14 at the Estadio Olímpico Universitario.

Records
Prior to the competition, the existing World and Olympic records were as follows.

Competition format
The competition consisted of a single final round. Each athlete is allowed three throws, with the top eight athletes after that point being given three further attempts.

Results

References

External links
 Official Olympic Report, la84foundation.org. Retrieved August 17, 2012.

Athletics at the 1968 Summer Olympics
Javelin throw at the Olympics
1968 in women's athletics
Women's events at the 1968 Summer Olympics